South Albury is a suburb of the city of Albury, New South Wales, located  south of the Albury Central Business District.

South Albury is a mixed use area, including residential, commercial and industrial. It is bounded by Central Albury, West Albury and East Albury to the north, and Wodonga (Victoria) to the south. South Albury was extremely prone to flooding but mitigation works in the 1990s have dramatically reduced the risk.

Geography 
South Albury is completely within the floodplain of the Murray River, and is bound by the Hume Highway/Hume Street to the north, the railway/freeway line to the east, Wodonga Place to the west and the Murray River to the south. The built-up part of the suburb includes residential and commercial/industrial areas.

Residents 
The 2006 population of 1102 did not include those south of the railway line. The most common religion was Catholic, followed by Anglican, and the median household income was $699 per week, below the Australian average of $1027 per week. The median age was 37.

Sport 

Aloysius Park in South Albury is home to the Albury Hotspurs Soccer Club. They compete in the Albury Wodonga Soccer Association.

References 

Suburbs of Albury, New South Wales